This is a list of members of the Western Australian Legislative Council from 22 May 1922 to 21 May 1924. The chamber had 30 seats made up of ten provinces each electing three members, on a system of rotation whereby one-third of the members would retire at each biennial election. During the term, the Country Party split into rival Ministerial (MCP) and Executive (ECP) factions–although in the Council, this was diluted somewhat by the refusal of some long-standing Country members to become involved in the dispute. The Executive faction, loyal to the Primary Producers' Association, prevailed and by 1925 the Ministerial faction had merged with the Nationalist Party.

Notes
 On 19 October 1922, Metropolitan-Suburban Province Nationalist MLC Archibald Sanderson resigned. Nationalist candidate Harry Boan won the resulting by-election on 25 November 1922.
 On 18 June 1923, South-West Province Nationalist MLC John Ewing was appointed Minister for Education, North West and Justice in the Ministry led by James Mitchell. He was therefore required to resign and contest a ministerial by-election, at which he was returned unopposed on 27 June 1923.
 On 17 June 1923, East Province Nationalist MLC Hal Colebatch resigned. Country candidate William Carroll won the resulting by-election on 11 August 1923.
 On 13 August 1923, West Province Labor MLC Frederick Baglin resigned. Labor candidate Edmund Gray won the resulting by-election on 8 September 1923.

Sources
 
 
 

Members of Western Australian parliaments by term